Łukasz Waldemar Gąsior (born January 14, 1986) is a Polish swimmer, who specialized in middle-distance freestyle events. He represented his nation Poland at the 2008 Summer Olympics, and has won a career total of three medals (two golds and one bronze) in a major international competition, spanning the 2004 European Junior Swimming Championships in Lisbon, Portugal.

Gasior competed for the Polish squad in two swimming events at the 2008 Summer Olympics in Beijing. He raced to a sixth-seeded time in 1:48.52 coming to the top-eight final to dip beneath the FINA B-standard (1:48.72) by two tenths of a second (0.2) at the European Championships five months earlier in Eindhoven, Netherlands. In the 200 m freestyle, Gasior rounded out the field to eighth in the last of eight heats with a frustrating 1:49.25, trailing eventual Olympic champion Michael Phelps of the United States and runner-up Park Tae-hwan of South by nearly four seconds, and missing the semifinals with a thirty-fourth place finish from the prelims. Gasior also teamed up with Łukasz Wójt, Michał Rokicki, and Przemysław Stańczyk in the 4 × 200 m freestyle relay. Swimming the lead-off leg, Gasior recorded a split of 1:48.40, and the Polish team went on to finish heat two in seventh place and fourteenth overall with a final time of 7:18.09.

References

External links
NBC 2008 Olympics profile

1986 births
Living people
Olympic swimmers of Poland
Swimmers at the 2008 Summer Olympics
Polish male freestyle swimmers
People from Łowicz County
Sportspeople from Łódź Voivodeship
21st-century Polish people